Oregon Route 53 is an Oregon state highway that runs through a pair of river valleys in the Oregon Coast range; those of the Necanicum River and the Nehalem River.  OR 53 traverses the Necanicum Highway No. 46 of the Oregon state highway system.

Route description
Oregon Route 53 begins (at its southern terminus) at a junction with U.S. Route 101 in the city of Nehalem.  Soon after leaving the city, the highway begins to follow the North Fork of the Nehalem River (and several minor tributaries).  Eventually, the highway and the river diverge; and the highway crosses through a pass to enter the basin of the Necanicum River.  It follows this river for a distance, until the highway ends at an intersection with U.S. Route 26 at Necanicum Junction.

OR 53 is a narrow, winding roadway for most of its length, and primarily serves local and recreational traffic.  Occasionally, however, closures of US 101 to the west (in particular, in or around the Arch Cape Tunnel, an area very prone to mudslides) will result in heavy commercial use of this roadway, as OR 53 and US 101 are the only viable routes between the Nehalem/Manzanita area and the Cannon Beach/Seaside area.

This route and highway are the former alignment of the Oregon Coast Highway, US 101.  Service to Cannon Beach, Arch Cape, and Manzanita were previously by discontinuous local roads.

Major intersections

References

053
Transportation in Tillamook County, Oregon
Transportation in Clatsop County, Oregon